The Zanzibar House of Representatives is the unicameral, subnational legislature of the autonomous islands of Zanzibar in Tanzania.

History
The current legislature was formed in 1980. Prior to this, the Revolutionary Council held both the executive and legislative functions for 16 years following the Zanzibar Revolution in 1964.

Current composition

ACT-Wazalendo achieved more than 10% of the vote and thus was included into the Government of National Unity according to the Zanzibar constitution. After a split in the so far strong CUF opposition party, most members and votes had shifted to ACT-W.

Composition after the 2016 election

The legislature formed in 2016 after the 2016 Zanzibari general elections consisted of 88 members. This election had been a repeat of the annulled 2015 election and was boycotted by the opposition.

Past election results
The results of the past elections held under the multiparty system are as follows:

The 2010 Zanzibari general election saw an almost equal division of votes between the two leading parties.  The 2015 election was annulled by the election commission, leading to protests from the CUF opposition and their boycott of the 2016 election in which the CCM won every elected seat.

See also
 National Assembly (Tanzania)

References

External links
 

 
Politics of Tanzania
Political organisations based in Tanzania
Zanzibar